Parliamentary elections were held in Colombia on 14 May 1933 to elect the Chamber of Representatives. The result was a victory for the Liberal Party, which won 74 of the 118 seats.

Results

References

Parliamentary elections in Colombia
Colombia
1933 in Colombia
Election and referendum articles with incomplete results